Charles Lynwood Harper (born August 14, 1944) is a former professional American football guard who played seven seasons in the National Football League (NFL) for the New York Giants.

1944 births
Living people
People from Haskell, Oklahoma
Players of American football from Oklahoma
American football offensive guards
Oklahoma State Cowboys football players
New York Giants players